Trinity Catholic College is an independent Roman Catholic co-educational secondary day school, located over two adjacent campuses in the Northern Rivers region, on the northern fringe of Lismore, New South Wales, Australia.

History
St Mary's College for Girls was founded by the Presentation Sisters in 1886, as a single-sex boarding school, and continued its development when the Marist Brothers opened St Joseph's High School for Boys in 1911. The two schools formally amalgamated to form Trinity Catholic College, Lismore in 1985, with a ceremony in late 1984 which laid the banners of St Mary's and St Joseph's schools to rest, and marked the official amalgamation of the two schools into Trinity Catholic College.

Brother Peter Pemble, a former principal of the College between 2001 and 2007, was sentenced in 2015 for child sexual abuse crimes against a boy that occurred in the 1970s while Pemble was a teacher at Marist Brothers High School, . After pleading guilty, Pemble was given a custodial sentence of 18 months, with a non-parole period of nine months.

In 2017, College Principal, Brother John Hilet, reported to the media that he felt privileged when two FTM transgender students confided in him that they were experiencing gender identity issues and sought to be identified as males.

On the 6th April 2022 it was announced that Jesse Smith would be appointed the role of College Principal following the conclusion of Brother John Hilet's tenure, having been acting principal since late 2021. He is the first lay principal to be appointed at the college.

Symbols

Motto
Trinity's motto is; In Word And Deed.

Badge
The triangle is an age old symbol of the blessed trinity – The father, Son and Holy Spirit. The cross stands as a reminder of the Christian nature of the college, and is the symbol of the life of Jesus. The Holy Trinity is a belief held by some Christian denominations, but not all, that the father, the son and the Holy Spirit all exist separately but together as a divine being.

Colours
The college colours of blue and gold were chosen by students to preserve the Marist tradition. Gold is the metal that never tarnishes, it is a symbol of God and love. Blue is associated with Mary, the mother of God who holds a special place in the college. The royal blue of the vest, jumpers and blazer also is symbolic of the morals and goals for the college.

House structure
The College's pastoral care structure is based on a House system that consists of ten Houses, led by a Head of House (HoH) and two house captains. Within each house, tutors care for a horizontal house system, where each year is split into house tutors. Families generally belong to the same house.

Students meet with their tutor each day for fifteen minutes, to carry out administrative duties and build a relationship with their peers. These houses are also the students sporting houses.

The ten houses are:
Cannane House (aqua) – named after the first principal of Trinity
Carthage House (magenta) – named after St Carthage of Lismore, County Waterford, Ireland
Champagnat House (royal blue) – named after Marcellin Champagnat, the founder of the Marist brothers
Chanel House (red) – named after a principal of St Mary's College
D'Arcy House (gold) – named after the founder of the Presentation Sisters' Lismore congregation
Dennis House (green) – named after a teacher from Trinity
Doyle House (purple) – named after the first Bishop of Lismore, Jeremiah Joseph Doyle (1849–1909)
McColl House (black) – named after the first principal of St. Joseph's High
Nagle House (white) – named after the founder of the Presentation Sisters, Nano Nagle
Wilson House (orange) – named after the pioneer family of Lismore (William Wilson (1805–1886))

Facilities
Because of the ancient nature of the school, it appears as very unusual architecture with some buildings dating back to foundation and others being as recent as 2010. Trinity has facilities for both the arts and sport which include:
 State of the art commercial kitchen capable for catering large functions (Graduation Ball).
 Equipped visual art and music rooms
 Chapel
 Three large halls
 Separate cafeteria, canteen and café
 Two libraries, each with computer areas, printing stations, air conditioned rooms for viewing movies and comprehensive collections of fictional and non-fictional texts
 Six computer rooms, each with enough computers for a class
 The Chanel theatre – used mainly for practicing dramatic performances; it includes adjustable seating, colour lighting, movable canvas backdrop and state of the art flooring
 The dance studio – for practicing dance; this studio has air conditioning, colour lighting, one permanent mirrored wall and a second collapsible mirrored wall, and sound system
 The Champagnat theatre – used to perform musical and dramatic pieces to a student or public audience. It features amphitheatre style seating for 250 people, air conditioning, extensive lighting, state of the art flooring, cinema-style screen and projectors and adapted acoustics.
 Sporting fields
 Trinity Sports Centre – includes:
 Two basketball/netball courts with extending divider
 Step seating for 250 people
 Foyer & storage areas
 Two PD/H/PE classrooms
 First aid room
 , 8 lane, indoor, heated swimming pool
 Outdoor basketball/netball courts
 Language center

The basketball area (known as the TSC hall or Trinity Sports Centre) is also used for full school assemblies. The hall includes space on the floor able to seat 1,300 students, a large stage area, spotlights, sound system, retractable basketball hoops, large projectors and screens on either side of the stage used for multimedia displays, responses and lyrics during ceremonies. The entire sporting complex is air conditioned.

Extra-curricular activities
The school takes part in a number of extra activities such as debating, public speaking and NIE (a local newspaper writing competition that takes place in the Lismore area).

See also

 List of Catholic schools in New South Wales
 Catholic education in Australia

References

External links
 

Educational institutions established in 1985
Catholic secondary schools in New South Wales
1985 establishments in Australia
Association of Marist Schools of Australia
Presentation Sisters schools
Lismore, New South Wales
Roman Catholic Diocese of Lismore